Mariachi los Camperos de Nati Cano is a Grammy Award-winning Los Angeles-based mariachi ensemble which was formerly led by Natividad "Nati" Cano.

History 
In 1950, Nati Cano joined a mariachi band in the city of Mexicali, Baja California, as an arranger. Cano was younger than any of the other members at the time. The group later relocated to Los Angeles, California, based out of a restaurant Nati founded as well, named "La Fonda de Los Camperos." Cano renamed the band, Mariachi los Camperos, meaning Countrymen.

Since the group's founding in 1961, they have performed in numerous venues throughout the United States and Mexico including Lincoln Center, the Kennedy Center, Walt Disney Concert Hall, and the Getty Center. In 1964, they were the first mariachi ensemble to perform in Carnegie Hall.

The ensemble was one of four mariachis that collaborated on Linda Ronstadt’s 1987 milestone album, Canciones de Mi Padre.  They also appear on Ronstadt’s sequel album, Mas Canciones, which was released in 1992, and toured with the singer nationwide.

Members
Nati Cano died October 3, 2014 due to declining health, passing on the group to the current musical director, Jesus "Chuy" Guzman. He has arranged songs for the group since 1992, leads the Mariachi Master Apprentice Program (MMAP) in San Fernando Valley, and teaches at the UCLA Herb Alpert School of Music.

Cuco Del Cid died in January 2018.

Former member Martin C. Padilla from El Paso, Texas, also died in January 2019.

Members:

 Violin: Jesús Guzmán (director), Raul Cuellar, Ernesto Lázaro, Ismael Hernández
 Trumpet: Javier Rodríguez
 Guitar: Jonathan Palomar
 Guitarrón: Juan Jiménez
 Harp: Sergio Alonso
.

Discography 
 Puro Mariachi (Indigo Records, 1961)
 North of the Border (RCA/Carino Records, 1965)
 El Super Mariachi, Los Camperos (Latin International, 1968)
 Valses de Amor (La Fonda Records, 1973)
 Canciones de Siempre (PolyGram Latino, 1993)
 Sounds of Mariachi (Delfin Records, 1996)
 Fiesta Navidad (Delfin Records, 1997)
 Viva el Mariachi (Smithsonian Folkways, 2003)
 ¡Llegaron Los Camperos!, (Smithsonian Folkways Recordings, 2004): nominated for the 2006 Grammy Award for Best Mexican/Mexican-American Album.

 Amor, Dolor y Lagrimas: Música Ranchera (Smithsonian Folkways Recordings, 2008): 2008 Grammy Award for Best Regional Mexican Album.

 Tradición, Arte y Pasión: Mariachi Los Camperos de Nati Cano (Smithsonian Folkways Recordings, 2015): nominated for the 2015 Grammy Award for Best Regional Mexican Album.

De Ayer Para Siempre (2019): De Ayer Para Siempre is nominated for the 2020 Grammy Award for Best Regional Mexican Music Album (Including Tejano)
They were also featured on Smithsonian Folkways' Raíces Latinas: Smithsonian Folkways Latino Roots Collection in 2002.

Awards 
Grammy Awards

They shared a 2005 Best Musical Album for Children Grammy for cellabration!, A tribute to Ella Jenkins.

References

External links
 Grammy Award for Mariachi los Camperos de Nati Cano | ARTIST SPOTLIGHT / Retrieved 2014-11-10 at Smithsonian Folkways

Mariachi groups
American mariachi musicians
Grammy Award winners
Musical groups from Los Angeles
Mexican-American culture in Los Angeles
American Latin musical groups